Talk's Cheap is the debut EP by Canadian punk rock band the Demics, released in 1979 on Ready Records.

The EP's first single "New York City" was the band's breakthrough on campus radio and commercial station CFNY. It was later named the greatest Canadian song of all time in a 1996 reader's poll by the Canadian music magazine Chart.

Track listing
 "I Wanna Know" - 2:34
 "You Tell Me" - 2:09
 "Talk's Cheap" - 1:43
 "New York City" - 4:32
 "Oh Well" - 0:51

Personnel
The Demics
 Keith Whittaker – vocals
 Rob Brent – guitars
 Iain Atkinson-Staines – bass
 James Weatherstone – drums

Additional personnel
 Lyndon Andrews – artwork
 Kevin Doyle – engineering
 Mike Hannay – photography
 Andrew Crosbie – production
 Angus MacKay – production

References

1979 debut EPs
The Demics albums